Adventures of Omanakkuttan is a 2017 Indian Malayalam comedy film directed by debutant Rohith V. S.. The story was conceived by Sameer Abdul and he wrote the screenplay along with the director. It stars Asif Ali, Bhavana, Aju Varghese and Saiju Kurup.It was Produced by Antony Binoy and Biju Pulickal under the banner 4M Entertainments and features music composed by Arun Muraleedharan and Dawn Vincent.

The film was released on 2017 May 19 across Kerala.

Plot
Omanakkuttan (Asif Ali) is an introverted sales executive working at a hair oil company named Clintonica owned by Chandran (Siddique), who used to be a snake oil salesman. During his time in the company, Omanakkuttan discovers a wide possibility that exists for chatting with women over phone through fake names and profiles and does so. Meanwhile, an SI (Srindaa Arhaan) whom he chats with posing as a police officer wants to see him for real. He dresses up as a police officer and comes to the venue of a music concert conducted by a musician named Sidharth (Rahul Madhav). He gets cold feet and runs away into the concert crowd, but not before the SI catches a glimpse of him. At the concert, Omanakkuttan sees Pallavi (Bhavana). Pallavi has come there to get in touch with Sidharth to get access to a bungalow for research purposes(Pallavi is a parapsychology research student who is trying to research about the existence of ghosts, etc.). At the end of the concert, Pallavi tries to call out to Sidharth and Sidharth asks Pallavi to pass her note-pad so he could give her his autograph. Pallavi finds that Sidharth has given his phone number too. But actually it was Omanakuttan who signed the note-pad and gave his number. They begin chatting over phone call. Pallavi does not know it is Omanakuttan with whom she chats and doesn't even mind him on the way. Omanakkuttan successfully continues chatting with Pallavi and several other women posing as different people from different backgrounds, while in real he is his shy and introverted self. One fateful day while returning late night from office, he is looted by a taxi driver and hit on his head and disposed in a dump yard, and wakes up to find that he has lost his memory. He forgets everything that has happened in his life so far, and even forgets his name. He has his phone but upon calling up in a few numbers, people address him with different names so he gets further confused. Stranded on the highway, he asks for lifts and one car stops and it is Pallavi inside. She takes him as a charity case for a favour without knowing it was with him she had been chatting all along. Omanakkuttan and Pallavi go on an adventure to find out who he really is or whether all of this is an act of his craft.

Cast
Asif Ali as Omanakkuttan / Jerry Thomas / Kubera / Michael Jackson / Manu / Rahul / Siddharth Iyer
Bhavana as Pallavi Deva
Aju Varghese as Shiva
Siddique as Chandrasekhar
Saiju Kurup as Philip Plamoodan
Kalabhavan Shajon as Vinayak Hegde
Rahul Madhav as Sidharth Iyer
Firoz Najeeb as Chenkappa
Aditi Ravi as Honey
Srinda as Mallika
Ardra Das as Shelvi
Sreejay Narayanan as Taxi Driver
Shivaji Guruvayoor as Sreedharan Nair
 Prasanth as Varadan
Arya Rohit as Sumathi Chandrasekhar
Adil Ibrahim as Sanju Wognum

Production
Asif Ali was roped in to play the lead role. Bhavana was finalized for the female Lead. The shoot of the film began in 2015.

Music

References

External links
 

Indian comedy films
2017 comedy films
2010s Malayalam-language films
Films scored by Arun Muraleedharan